Lee Saunders Gerow (March 29, 1891 – May 19, 1982) was a decorated brigadier general  in the United States Army with service in World War I and World War II. He was the younger brother of Leonard T. Gerow.

Early military years

Lee was born on March 29, 1891, in Petersburg, Virginia, as a son of Leonard Rogers Gerow and Annie Eloise Saunders. He attended the Virginia Military Institute and graduated on June 18, 1913. Gerow did not enter the Army immediately, but first was appointed a commandant of Bingham Military School in North Carolina. Subsequently, he spent some time as assistant commandant of Columbia Military Academy in Tennessee, before he was commissioned a second lieutenant in the Regular Army on November 30, 1916.

He was assigned to the 36th Infantry Regiment in 1916 and was stationed on the Mexican border at Del Rio, Texas during the Pancho Villa Expedition. He was also promoted to the rank of first lieutenant dating back to the November 30, 1916. Subsequently, he was transferred to Fort Snelling, Minnesota, where he was appointed a company commander. He was also promoted to the rank of captain in the next year.

Gerow was promoted to the rank of major on September 26, 1918, and transferred to the Camp Sherman, Ohio, where he assumed command of 3rd Battalion of the 379th Infantry Regiment. Here Gerow assisted in training of newly activated 95th Infantry Division, which was prepared for deployment overseas. On 11 November, the Armistice with Germany was signed, ending the hostilities. The division's deployment was cancelled and it was demobilized in December 1918.

In January 1919, Gerow was called to Washington, D.C., where he was assigned to the Army Finance Office. His new task was to take charge of the payment of the Bonus granted by Congress to the all honourably discharged soldiers who had served between April 6, 1917, and November 11, 1918, in the World War. He stayed in this capacity until June 1920.

Interwar service

Gerow was subsequently sent overseas, where he was assigned to the American Expeditionary Forces, where he was appointed a commanding officer of the Visitors Bureau, stationed in Koblenz, Germany.

World War II

At the beginning of World War II, Lee Gerow was appointed a commander of the newly activated 338th Infantry Regiment, which was part of the 85th Infantry Division under the command of Major General John B. Coulter. The regiment, which was stationed at Camp Shelby, Mississippi, conducted the Basic infantry training until the end of the year 1943.

He was also promoted to the rank of brigadier general in that year and was also appointed Assistant commanding general of the 85th Infantry Division.

Medals and decorations

Here is the ribbon bar of Brigadier General Lee S. Gerow:

References

External links
Generals of World War II

1891 births
1982 deaths
People from Petersburg, Virginia
Virginia Military Institute alumni
United States Army Command and General Staff College alumni
United States Army War College alumni
Naval War College alumni
United States Army generals of World War II
United States Army generals
Recipients of the Silver Star
Recipients of the Legion of Merit
Recipients of the Croix de Guerre 1939–1945 (France)
Recipients of the War Cross for Military Valor
Burials at Arlington National Cemetery
Military personnel from Virginia
United States Army personnel of World War I
United States Army Infantry Branch personnel